Pond Mill Bridge, also known as Pondtown Mill Bridge, is a historic stone arch bridge in Latimore Township, Adams County, Pennsylvania. The bridge crosses Bermudian Creek.

It was added to the National Register of Historic Places in 1988.

References

Road bridges on the National Register of Historic Places in Pennsylvania
Bridges in Adams County, Pennsylvania
National Register of Historic Places in Adams County, Pennsylvania
Stone arch bridges in the United States